Samoana cramptoni is a species of tropical, air-breathing land snail, a terrestrial, pulmonate, gastropod mollusk in the family Partulidae. It is endemic to the island of ʻEua, Tonga.

References

C
Fauna of Tonga
Molluscs of Oceania
Critically endangered fauna of Oceania